Calotis cymbacantha, the showy burr daisy, is a species of Calotis native to the arid areas of Australia. It is a perennial herb that grows between 10 and 40 cm tall. It has hairy erect stems which are woody at the base and produces yellow flowers (Seeds of South Australia, 2018) (Victoria Flora, 2018).

Description 
Petals: Bright yellow petals, with 18-30 per flower head being 5 mm long and 1.5 mm wide. The flowers have a yellow centre borne on leafy slender stalks (Cunningham et al. 1992).  
Leaves: Oblong leaves that are between 10-65 mm long and 7-15 mm in width. 
Seeds: Obovate, flat and warty on each face, 2-3 mm long. They are boat-shaped towards the base.
Flowers: August- October. 
(Seeds of South Australia, 2018), (Cunningham et al. 1992).

History  
The species was first described by Ferdinand von Mueller. He was a botanist that was appointed chief botanist for the colony of Victoria in 1853. He discovered many Australian plants, including the showy burr daisy (Morris, 1974).

Distribution 
Found in areas of sandy plains and arid areas (Cunningham et al., 1992)(Seeds of Australia, 2018). It is found mostly within the west of New South Wales, although it is distributed also to the south of Victoria and South Australia (Cunningham et al. 1992). 

It lives within sparse mulga, black blue bush and other shrub communities within the sandplains and dune fields (Cunningham et al. 1992).

Name meaning  
The genus name, Calotis, comes from the Greek word kalos meaning beautiful. The specific name, cymbacantha, comes from the Greek word kymbe meaning boat and akantha meaning thorn and spine which refers to the boat-shaped shape of the seed (Morris, 1974),(Seeds of South Australia. 2018).

References 

GM Cunningham, WE Mulham, PL Milthorpe and JH Leigh (1992) Plants of Western New South Wales. Inkata Press, Sydney.
Atlas of Living Australia (2018) Calotis cymbacantha F.Muell. Burr-Daisy. Retrieved from: https://bie.ala.org.au/species/http://id.biodiversity.org.au/node/apni/2886848#overview
Victoria Flora (2018) Royal Botanic Gardens Victoria: Calotis cymbacantha - Burr Daisy.  Retrieved from: https://vicflora.rbg.vic.gov.au/flora/taxon/b2860a7a-3e1c-4cf4-bae6-87520356a4e2
Morris, D (1974). Ferdinand Von Muller. Australian Dictionary Of Biography, Australian National University. Retrieved from: http://adb.anu.edu.au/biography/mueller-sir-ferdinand-jakob-heinrich-von-4266/text6893. 
Seeds of Australia (2018) Calotis cymbacantha (Showy Burr-Daisy) Retrieved from: http://saseedbank.com.au/species_information.php?rid=929

Astereae
Taxa named by Ferdinand von Mueller
Flora of Australia